Browning station is a train station in Browning, Montana. It is a seasonal stop for Amtrak's Empire Builder, open from October to April. It serves Browning and the rest of the Blackfeet Indian Reservation, as well as the eastern side of Glacier National Park. It functions as an alternate for the East Glacier Park station at Glacier National Park, which closes during the winter.

The station, platform, and parking are owned by BNSF Railway with the station facilities owned by Amtrak. Amtrak rebuilt the station in 2012 to be accessible to people with disabilities by adding a  concrete platform, a ramp, platform lighting, a wheelchair lift enclosure and disabled parking spaces. The old Great Northern Railway station building was removed in 2013, leaving only the platform and parking area. The Great Northern station was known as Fort Browning.

Notes and references

External links 

Browning Amtrak Station (USA RailGuide – TrainWeb)

Amtrak stations in Montana
Buildings and structures in Glacier County, Montana
Transportation in Glacier County, Montana
Fort Browning